Megoroba Stadium is a multi-use stadium in Ozurgeti, Guria region, Georgia used mostly for football matches. It is the home stadium of FC Mertskhali Ozurgeti. The stadium is able to hold 3,500 people.

References

See also 
FC Mertskhali Ozurgeti
Stadiums in Georgia

Buildings and structures in Guria
Football venues in Georgia (country)
Sports venues completed in 1968
Sports venues in Georgia (country)